Jason de Reuck (born 6 June 1979) is a South African cricketer. He played in one first-class match for Eastern Province in 1998/99.

See also
 List of Eastern Province representative cricketers

References

External links
 

1979 births
Living people
South African cricketers
Eastern Province cricketers
Cricketers from Port Elizabeth